Bareezé is a Pakistani high-end fashion retailer which is based in Lahore, Pakistan. 

It has its operations in Malaysia, United Arab Emirates, and the United Kingdom. It was founded by Pakistani fashion designer and philanthropist Seema Aziz.

History
Founded in 1985 in Lahore by Seema Aziz. Its parent company is Sefam (Pvt.) Ltd.

Brands
 Chinyere
 Kayseria
 Leisure Club
 Minnie Minors (for children)
 Super Squad
 Rang Ja
 Bareeze Man
 Working Woman
 Shahnameh
 Bareeze Home Expressions
 Mom 2 B (closed)
 Urban Culture (closed)
 Minitoes ( New Born )
 The Fabric Store (TFS)

Network
Bareezé has 90 shops in Pakistan and four other countries: India, Malaysia, United Arab Emirates and United Kingdom. It also has a network of franchises. The company has nearly 5000 employees.

Council of Business Leaders
Bareezé co-founder Seema Aziz was chosen as a member to be on the Council of Business Leaders formed by the Prime Minister of Pakistan, Imran Khan in October 2018.

References 

Companies based in Lahore
Retail companies established in 1985
Clothing retailers of Pakistan
Clothing brands of Pakistan
Clothing companies of Pakistan
Luxury brands
Pakistani companies established in 1985